Moshupa is a large village in the Southern District of Botswana with a population of 20,016 per the 2011 census. The people of Moshupa are called the Bakgatla-ba-ga Mmanaana, a group also found in Thamaga.  Along with the related Bakgatla-ba-ga Kgafela of Mochudi, they arrived to the region from the Transvaal region in South Africa throughout the eighteenth century.

Moshupa is characterised by unique and gigantic mountain outcrops which often leave visitors in wonder. The giant rocks (some up to 40 metres in radius) are so balanced on top of each other that even the villagers themselves wonder why they do not fall. They are believed to fall only when the village chief is dying, as an omen.

The chief (kgosi) of Moshupa is Kgosi Kgabosetso Mosielele. The chief currently serves in the Customary Court of appeal and his brother, Kgosi Oscar Mosielele is the current chief of the village on his behalf. As is customary in Botswana the salutation 'kgosi' is the title used before the chiefs name.

Geography
There are three seasonal rivers crossing Moshupa, the Mosope, Hatshelatladi (Gatsalatladi), and Monnaamme, and Kolwane further in the north. The Mosope River is legended as the host of a Kgwanyape (a dragon, called Bushi, Seriri, or Noga ya metsi). The villagers avoid crossing the Mosope River, particularly at night where the river joins the Phuting/Kgosing mountain for fear of the Kgwanyape. This place, called Lefikeng, or just 'Hikeng' has a large rock outcrop curiously balanced upon the river banks with a perennial pond underneath it. Although villagers avoid this place, visitors venture there, especially white tourists or Peace Corps volunteers, giving rise to the local belief that the 'Kgwanyape' turns into a white lady and sunbathes during the day.

Infrastructure
There are six primary schools, three junior secondary schools, and a senior secondary school in Moshupa. In addition there are a few day-care centers and an orphanage. A vocational training center (Moshupa Brigade) offers trade, business, and secretarial courses with some evening classes.

Moshupa also has council administration offices to the north, headed by Sub-council Chairman on the political side and a Senior Assistant Council Secretary on the administrative side.

The health system consists of three clinics with full-time nurses and visiting physicians to handle childbirth and short time inpatients.  The clinic refers major cases to the Kanye hospital or the Thamaga Hospital. There are plans to build a hospital in Moshupa. One of the latest additions to Moshupa has been a detention center for young offenders to the west.

Demographics
Moshupa is divided into wards or dikgotla, typical of Botswana villages. They are Kgosing, Nakedi, Phuting, Kgope, Maradung, Thupelo, Mmapholana, Mmaditswere, Nkaikela, Mmamohuhumedi, Rungwana, Modimele, Sau, Jerusalem (part of Phuting), Mokakaneng, Mogaung, Maunatlala, Dibotong, Mmaseetsele, Lepapeng, Ntle ga majwe, and other wards emerge with village growth. Each kgotla has its own sub-chief or Kgosana.

The settlement into Moshupa was the final settlement of the Bakgatla-ba-Mmanaana after the Battle of Dimawe. The area may have been chosen for its mountainous natural defence or because of the presence of a seasonal water source (Mosope River).  In the early 20th century problems with the Bangwaketse chief, Bathoen II, led to a split of the village with the main chief Kgosi Gobuamang (I) Mosielele leaving to live in Thamaga in 1934 under the Kwena territory. The main royal family was hence based in Thamaga, and some of the Moshupa chiefs, such as the late Ramputswa Mosielele and Diratsame Gobuamang II, came from the Thamaga royal family.

Religion
There are a large number of Christians in Moshupa. The most popular are the United Congregational Church of South Africa, the Seventh-day Adventist Church, the Assemblies of God, the Apostolic Faith Mission, the Roman Catholic Church, the Zion Christian Church, and the Indian Pentecostal Church of God alongside other Afro-Christian and Charismatic Pentecostal assemblies. One of the oldest churches is the Mothowagae Church, established in 1903.

Ethnicity
Moshupa is occupied predominantly by Bakgatla baga Mmanaana and it has several ethnic groups that melded into the village as it grew. To the south are mostly Bangwaketse people, to the west there are groups with Kgalagadi ancestry while the inhabitants of Phuting are thought to be of a Ngwato ancestry: hence the name 'Phuting', from the animal phuti (African duiker), a Ngwato tribal totem. The people of Mogaung ward are considered Bangwaketse.

There are a considerable number of people of Afrikaans ancestry in the Maburung kgotla who can trace their roots to South Africa (Cape Colony) and 17th century the Netherlands. The most well known of them are the Stegling and the Ludick family. They still speak Afrikaans, a language similar to post medieval Dutch. They are sometimes referred to as 'Maburu', although the use of the word is sometimes considered derogatory. The word comes from the Dutch word 'Boers', meaning 'farmers', from the strong farming culture of the first Cape Colony settlers from the Netherlands. Almost all Nguni (Xhosa, Swati, Zulu) and Sotho-Tswana tribes use the same word.

There are also a number of business people of Middle eastern and Indian origin who have become Batswana while living as their own small tight communities. Along with Ramotswa this was one of the first places that Indian residents settled in the 1880s. Prominent businessman and former member of parliament, Satar Dada has roots in Moshupa's Indian community (historically referred to as "Arabs" for various reasons including their Muslim faith).

Industry
The area around Moshupa consists of crop and cattle farmland, the latter highly overgrazed, on a path to desertification. There are also a number of poultry farmers clustered in one place who supply the local market. Poultry is a lucrative business in Moshupa. There is also a vegetable farm on a wetland along the river where spinach, tomatoes and other vegetables are raised. Most vegetables are imported into local supermarkets because Moshupa is too arid for productive farming.

Moshupa does not have a major shopping center but a cluster of shops around the main road, selling goods from lingerie and food to building materials and furniture. A Local bakery supplies bread to all vendors and schools in Moshupa. There are also a number of hair salons that boom around Christmas time. They all specialise in afro-styles. There are also a few metal-smiths who specialise in welding and supplying local tomb crates (good business). Trade services such as plumbing, bricklaying, and electrical installation are supplied by individuals, in a largely unregulated trade.

Like many Botswana villages, development is controlled by a group of volunteers and the local municipality called the Village Development Committee. They usually deal with minor projects that do not require expert consultancy such as government housing and the management of landscaping projects.

Politics
There are as few as four and as many as seven political parties dominant in Moshupa. The current reigning party is the Botswana Democratic Party (BDP, Domkrag).  There is also considerable support for the Botswana Congress Party and The Botswana National Front and the Botswana Alliance Movement.

The member of parliament for Moshupa is the Hon Karabo Gare and His excellency Dr Mokgweetsi Keabetswe Eric Masisi, a Moshupa native, is serving in the current cabinet as the President of Botswana. From a political pedigree Hon. Masisi is son to the first MP for Moshupa who won the first elections after independence. Hon Mokgweetsi Eric Masisi also had one of his brothers serving as an MP in Francistown West constituency before his passing in 2013. He has received advanced training at graduate level in the fields of education, economics (social policy and social development) and recently began studying epidemiology.

While the village is one of the most picturesque villages in the country it has not capitalised on its tourism potential and is not yet considered a tourist destination. It does have a Bed and Breakfast Guest-House in Jerusalem ward. There are a large number of bars, liquor shops and one newly opened night club. The nearest motel is in Kanye, thirty minutes drive from Moshupa. Workers in the Peace corps and volunteers can have accommodation organised through the Village Development Committee (V.D.C.) housing which is highly subsidised.

Moshupa should actually be spelled and pronounced Mosopa, but has the name Moshupa because the first documenters were British, who did not pronounce it faithfully.

An extensive history of Moshupa was made by Dr Jeff Ramsay, a historian who now works as press secretary to the office of the President. The information can be accessed at the Botswana National Archives by request. Some research has also been done by the University of Botswana history and geology department about Moshupa and can be accessed at the University Library.

References
 Comptes Rendus (1954)
 University of London Institute of Commonwealth Studies (1968) Collected Seminar Papers, no.8-13 1967-1971

Line notes

Populated places in Botswana